Boris Vladimirovich Struminsky (14 August 1939 – 18 January 2003) was a Russian and Ukrainian physicist known for his contribution to theoretical elementary particle physics.

Biography
Boris Struminsky was born on 14 August 1939 in Malakhovka, a settlement in Ukhtomsky District (now Lyuberetsky District), Moscow Oblast, RSFSR, USSR. His father was academician Vladimir Vasilyevich Struminsky (1914—1998).

After finishing the school Boris Struminsky started his studies at Faculty of Physics of Moscow State University, which he graduated in 1962.

From 1962 to 1965 Struminsky was a doctoral student at Steklov Institute of Mathematics in Moscow. From 1965 he continued his work at the same institute as a junior researcher. In 1965 he successfully defended his Ph.D. (C.Sc.) thesis devoted to Higher-order symmetries and composite models of elementary particles.

In 1966 Struminsky started his work at Joint Institute for Nuclear Research in Dubna, first as a researcher, and then, from 1967, as a senior researcher of the Laboratory of Theoretical Physics.

In 1971 Boris Struminsky moved to Institute for Theoretical Physics of the Academy of Science of the Ukrainian SSR (now Bogolyubov Institute for Theoretical Physics of the National Academy of Sciences of Ukraine) in Kyiv, where he worked until the end of his life, first as a senior researcher, and then as a leading researcher. In 1973 Struminsky successfully defended his D.Sc. thesis devoted to Finite energy sum rules and the dual resonance model.

Research
The main scientific results of Boris Struminsky are related to the quark structure of hadrons — elementary particles held together by the strong force. His two 1965 papers (he is the only author of the first one, and the second one was written together with Nikolay Bogolyubov and Albert Tavkhelidze) contained an idea to introduce a new quantum number for the quarks, which was later called a color charge. Later on, this has become one of the basic ideas of quantum chromodynamics — the theory describing strong interaction of elementary particles.

Many papers by Boris Struminsky deal with various problems related to the structure of hadrons, as well as interaction of hadrons and nuclei. He published about 100 papers devoted to these topics.

Selected papers
 B.V. Struminsky, Magnetic moments of baryons in the quark model , JINR Publication P-1939, Dubna, 1965 
 N.N. Bogolyubov, B.V. Struminsky, and A.N. Tavkhelidze, On the composite models in theories of elementary particles, JINR Publication D-1968, Dubna, 1965
 B.V. Struminsky and A.N. Tavkhelidze, Quarks and composite models of elementary particles , in: High Energy Physics and Elementary Particles Theory, pp. 625–634. Naukova Dumka, Kyiv, 1967  
 V.A. Matveev, B.V. Struminsky, and A.N. Tavkhelidze, Dispersion sum rules and SU(3) symmetry,  Physics Letters, 22, No.2, 146, 1966
 A.N. Vall, L.L. Jenkovszky, and B.V. Struminsky, High energy hadron interactions, Soviet Journal of Particles and Nuclei (ЭЧАЯ), 19, p. 180—223, 1988

References

External links
 Color of Quarks — Workshop in memory of B.V. Struminsky (May 16—17, 2013, Kyiv), Bogolyubov Institute for Theoretical Physics
 V.A. Matveev, In memory of Boris Vladimirovich Struminsky 
 F.V. Tkachov, A contribution to the history of quarks: Boris Struminsky's 1965 JINR publication, arXiv:0904.0343

1939 births
2003 deaths
Theoretical physicists
Soviet physicists
20th-century Russian physicists
20th-century Ukrainian physicists
21st-century Russian physicists
21st-century Ukrainian physicists
Moscow State University alumni